Commana is a commune in the Finistère department of Brittany in northwestern France.

Population
Inhabitants of Commana are called in French Commanéens.

Breton language
In 2009, 45.1% of primary-school children attended bilingual schools, where Breton language is taught alongside French.

See also
Communes of the Finistère department
Parc naturel régional d'Armorique
Roland Doré sculptor
Commana Parish close

References

External links
Official website 

Mayors of Finistère Association 

Communes of Finistère